Loch Lomond Seaplanes is an airline based in Scotland. After receiving approval from the United Kingdom Civil Aviation Authority and Clydeport to launch services from Glasgow Seaplane Terminal, by Glasgow's Science Centre on the River Clyde in Glasgow city centre its maiden scheduled service from Glasgow to Oban began in August 2007, making it Europe's first city centre seaplane service  It is Scotland and the United Kingdom's first commercial seaplane service Loch Lomond Seaplanes Ltd holds a United Kingdom Civil Aviation Authority Type B Operating Licence, it is permitted to carry passengers, cargo and mail on aircraft with fewer than 20 seats and/or weighing less than 10 tonnes. It also has a base outside the hotel Cameron House, Loch Lomond, hence the operator's name. Their aircraft have featured on British television several times, including on BBC's Countryfile, ITV's Emmerdale and NBC's Running Wild starring Bear Grylls and Ben Stiller

History 

Loch Lomond Seaplanes began operations in April 2004 with a new amphibious Cessna T206H, registration G-OLLS, and is licensed as an airline under the UK Civil Aviation Authority with Air Operator's Certificate 2252. The first base was inside the newly formed Loch Lomond and Trossachs National Park. Initially flights were only for tourist/pleasure purposes but in 2007 scheduled flights were established. Loch Lomond Seaplanes took delivery of the UK's first Amphibious Cessna 208 Caravan, registration G-MDJE, in June 2007. In August 2007, Mr Stewart Stevenson MSP, The Minister for Transport, Infrastructure and Climate Change opened the new £125,000 Loch Lomond Seaplanes’ Glasgow Seaplane Terminal on the River Clyde beside the Glasgow Science Centre on Pacific Quay. The company was then able to launch its first scheduled service to Oban Bay. Since then the company has frequently been recognised as a top tourist attraction, and topped various polls of the sort.

Services 

Currently the airline operates tour and charter flights out of Loch Lomond

Fleet

The Loch Lomond Seaplanes fleet includes the following aircraft (at January 2018):

See also

 List of seaplane operators

References 

 Airliner World UK & Ireland Airlines Guide 2011-2012, page 19
 Companies House Company Number SC243178

External links 
 Loch Lomond Seaplanes
 Clyde Waterfront Regeneration - Loch Lomond Seaplane service
 

Airlines of Scotland
Airlines of the United Kingdom
Airlines established in 2003
Companies of Scotland
Seaplane operators
Helensburgh
2003 establishments in Scotland